Onnum Ridge is a mountain spur that descends northeast to McCraw Glacier, 3 nautical miles (6 km) south of Derrick Peak in the Britannia Range. Named in association with Britannia by a University of Waikato (N.Z.), geological party, 1978–79, led by Michael Selby. Onnum is a historical placename formerly used in Roman Britain.

Ridges of Oates Land